Yi Eun-jung (born 11 January 1988) is a Korean professional golfer who plays on the LPGA Tour.

Yi was born in Uijeongbu, South Korea. She turned professional in 2006 and joined the Duramed Futures Tour. She qualified for the LPGA Tour via the Qualifying Tournament at the end of 2007. Her first LPGA Tour victory came at the 2009 Jamie Farr Owens Corning Classic.

Amateur wins
2005 U.S. Women's Amateur Public Links

Professional wins

LPGA Tour wins (1)

LPGA Tour playoff record (1–0)

Results in LPGA majors
Results not in chronological order before 2014.

^ The Evian Championship was added as a major in 2013.

CUT = missed the half-way cut
WD = withdrew
T = tied

References

External links

Eunjung Yi profile at Yahoo! Sports

South Korean female golfers
LPGA Tour golfers
Sportspeople from Gyeonggi Province
People from Uijeongbu
Sportspeople from Riverside County, California
People from Murrieta, California
1988 births
Living people